Spaceship is a R&B and soul song by American recording artist Anhayla, released in the US on January 22, 2015. The single was featured on a 2015 AT&T advertisement.

Charts

References

External links
 Spaceship on Discogs
 Spaceship on iTunes

2015 singles
2015 songs